Jack Green (born 12 March 1951 in Glasgow, Scotland) is a Scottish musician and songwriter.

Green played with T. Rex between 1973 and 1974, then with Pretty Things between 1974 and 1976, recording Silk Torpedo and Savage Eye. After Phil May walked out on the Pretty Things he carried on with Peter Tolson, Gordon Edwards and Skip Alan in Metropolis. He also was a member of Rainbow for three weeks in late 1978.

He launched a solo career with the album Humanesque in 1980. This included the single "This is Japan" which peaked at number 35 in Australia. The album generated multiple hits, particularly "Babe", in the Canadian province of Alberta, but not the rest of the country: "You couldn’t find his record with a search warrant outside of Alberta. It was a strange regional phenomenon and it doesn’t happen that often," according to a radio host.

This was followed by Reverse Logic in 1981, Mystique in 1983 and Latest Game in 1986.

He joined with former T-Rex members Mickey Finn and Paul Fenton in Mickey Finn's T-Rex (1997-1999).

Green is now living in Ryde, Isle of Wight, where he teaches guitar, and owns a budget film production company.

A new album The Party at the End of the World was release in 2020.

Solo albums 
(1980) Humanesque
(1981) Reverse Logic
(1983) Mystique
(1986) Latest Game
(2020) The Party at the End of the World

References

1951 births
Living people
20th-century Scottish male singers
Scottish rock guitarists
Scottish male guitarists
Musicians from Glasgow
People from Ryde
T. Rex (band) members
Pretty Things members
21st-century Scottish male singers